Qafasabad (also Romanized as Qafasābād; also known as Feyzābād, Kābasābād, Kabsabad, and Qabasābād) is a village in Abharrud Rural District, in the Central District of Abhar County, Zanjan Province, Iran. There were 99 families and 487 people living there as of the 2006 Census.

References 

Populated places in Abhar County